The following page lists all power stations in Kazakhstan.

Fossil fuel

Coal

Oil

Natural Gas

Renewable

Hydroelectric

Solar

Nuclear 
Aktau (Kazakhstan State Corporation for Atomic Power and Industry)
BN-350 : 135 MWe reactor operational 1958-1999

See also 

 List of power stations in Europe
 List of largest power stations in the world

Kazakhstan
 
Lists of buildings and structures in Kazakhstan